The Manufacturing clause is a clause contained in copyright legislation requiring that as a condition of obtaining copyright, all copies of a work must be printed or otherwise produced domestically, from plates set domestically, rather than imported.  In the United States, a manufacturing clause was included in the International Copyright Act of 1891, which allowed certain non-resident aliens to obtain U.S. copyrights for the first time. The clause initially covered books, maps, photographs, and lithographs, and was subsequently extended to periodicals as well.  Its extension to all other media was proposed in the 1897 Treloar Copyright Bill, which failed in committee.  The manufacturing clause did not expire until 1986, keeping the United States out of the Berne Convention until 1989.

Copyright law
Intellectual property law